Established professorships at the University of Edinburgh

The title of the professorship is followed by the date of foundation. Dates in italics indicate the year of foundation of lectureships on which chairs were based. As of June 2019, the list appears incomplete.

 Chair of Divinity (1620)
 Chair of Hebrew and Oriental Languages (1642), now the Chair of Hebrew and Old Testament Studies
 Chair of Mathematics (1674)
 Chair of Medicine (1685)
 Chair of Ecclesiastical History (1694)
 Regius Chair of Public Law and the Law of Nature and Nations (1707)
 Chair of Moral Philosophy (1708)
 Chair of Logic & Metaphysics (1708)
 Chair of Civil Law (1710)
 Chair of Chemistry (1713) (founded as 'Chair of Physik and Chymistry' where 'physik' = medicine)
 Chair of Universal History & Greek & Roman Antiquities (1719) (from 1909, 'Constitutional History', and from 1945, 'Constitutional Law and History')
 Chair of Scots Law (1722)
 Chair of Botany (1738), now the Regius Chair of Plant Sciences
 Regius Chair of Rhetoric and English Literature (1762)
 Chair of Natural History (1767)
 Regius Chair of Astronomy (1785)
 Regius Chair of Clinical Surgery (1802)
 Regius Chair of Forensic Medicine (1807)
 Chair of Military Surgery (1806, abolished 1856)
 Reid Professorship of Music (1833)
 Regius Chair of Sanskrit (1862), now the Regius Chair of South Asian Language, Culture and Society
 Regius Chair of Engineering (1868)
 Chair of Commercial and Political Economy and Mercantile Law (1870)
 Regius Chair of Geology (1871)
 Watson Gordon Chair of Fine Art (1880)
 Chair of Celtic Languages, Literature, History & Antiquities (1882)
 Sir William Fraser Chair of Scottish History and Palaeography (1901)
 Abercromby Chair of Archaeology (1927)
 Edward Clark Professor of Child Life and Health (1931)
 Ogilvie Professor of Human Geography (1931)
 Grant Chair of Dermatology (1946) - First such chair in Great Britain
 Forbes Chair of Medical Radiology (1947)
 Forbes Chair of Organic Chemistry (1947)
 Forbes Chair of Surgical Neurology (1947)
 Forbes Chair of English Language (1948)
 George Harrison Law Chair of Orthopaedic Surgery (1947)
 Grierson Professor of English Literature (1950)
 Masson Professor of English Literature
 Maclaurin Chair of Mathematics (1964)
 Chair of Statistics (1966)
 Crum Brown Chair of Chemistry (1967)
 Chair of Applied Mathematics (1968)
 Salvesen Chair of European Institutions (1968)
 Lord President Reid Chair of Law (1972)
 Crawford Tercentenary Chair of Chemistry (2014)
 A. G. Leventis Chair of Byzantine Studies (2015)
 Will Davidson Chair of Law (2016)

References

External links
 School of Chemistry
 University of Edinburgh
 Edinburgh Law School
 School of History and Classics, University of Edinburgh

Professorships
Edinburgh-related lists